Tuckahoe State Park is a public recreation area located along Tuckahoe Creek in Caroline and Queen Anne's counties on the Eastern Shore of Maryland, United States. Adkins Arboretum, a garden and preserve maintaining over 600 native plant species, occupies 500 acres of the park. The arboretum provides classes to the public in horticulture, ecology and natural history.

Activities and amenities
The state park features a  lake for fishing and boating plus  of trails for hiking, biking, and equestrian use. The park also offers camping, cabins, and hunting as well as a recycled-tire playground for children.

The American Discovery Trail runs through the park.

In the news
Residents who felt the quiet, rural nature of the park was threatened spoke out against a military training facility that was proposed to be built nearby in 2009, and plans for it were scrapped in 2010.

References

External links
Tuckahoe State Park Maryland Department of Natural Resources
Tuckahoe State Park Map Maryland Department of Natural Resources

State parks of Maryland
Parks in Caroline County, Maryland
Protected areas established in 1963